Mu Serpentis, Latinized from μ Serpentis, is a binary star in the Serpens Caput (head) section of the equatorial constellation Serpens. It is visible to the naked eye with an apparent visual magnitude of 3.543. Based upon an annual parallax shift of 19.23 mas as seen from Earth, it is located around 170 light years from the Sun.

This is an astrometric binary for which coarse orbital elements have been determined based on interferometric observations. The pair orbit each other with a period of around 36 years and an eccentricity of roughly 0.4. The primary member, component A, is a white-hued A-type main sequence star with a stellar classification of A0 V. The nature of the secondary, component B, is less certain – it may be a class A or F type star of unknown luminosity class.

In Chinese astronomy, Mu Serpentis is called 天乳, Pinyin: Tiānrǔ, meaning Celestial Milk, because this star is marking itself and stand alone in Celestial Milk asterism, Root mansion (see : Chinese constellation).

References

A-type main-sequence stars
Astrometric binaries
Serpentis, Mu
Serpens (constellation)
Serpentis, 32
141513
077516
5881
Durchmusterung objects